San Giuseppe (Italian: "St. Joseph") is a quartiere or neighbourhood of Naples, southern Italy, which includes many of the points of interest on the western side of the historic centre of the city, including the square and church of Gesù Nuovo, the buildings along via Benedetto Croce (also known as Spaccanapoli) and the square, Piazza San Domenico Maggiore.

References

Quartieri of Naples